"That's what I'm talking about" (with spoken emphasis usually on "that's") is a phrase used to express enthusiastic support for whatever "that" refers to in context. It is used as a title in many works:

 "That's What I'm Talking About", a song written by Helene Gross, copyrighted on 8 April 1974
 "That's What I'm Talking About", a song from the 2002 album Livin' Right by Steve Forde and the Flange
 That's What I'm Talking About, the debut album by Australian singer Shannon Noll, released on 8 February 2004
 "That's What I'm Talking About", a song from rapper WC
 That's What I'm Talking About, a 2010 EP featuring WC's song of the same name
 That's What I'm Talking About, a 2010 autobiographical book by Shane Crawford; its title is based on his exclamation of "That's what I'm talkin' about!" upon receiving his premiership medallion for his team's victory at the 2008 AFL Grand Final.
 That's What I'm Talking About, a 2014 comedy album by Bob Saget
 Everybody Wants Some!!, a 2016 film with the working title That's What I'm Talking About